is the fifth studio album released by the Japanese rock band Asian Kung-Fu Generation, released on November 5, 2008. The album peaked at the second position on both the Oricon charts and Billboard Japan as well as at number eighteen on the World Chart. Its lead single, "Fujisawa Loser" managed to peak at number five on the Japan Hot 100 and at the number six spot on Oricon. The album's tracks are named after notable stops along the famous Enoshima Electric Railway in order starting from Fujisawa and ending with Kamakura. Additionally, it includes the three b-sides "Enoshima Escar," "Yuigahama Kite," and "Kugenama Surf" released over the past two years within "Korogaru Iwa, Kimi ni Asa ga Furu," "After Dark," and "Aru Machi no Gunjō" respectively. In promotion of the conceptual album, on November 9, the band held an exclusive live concert within an undisclosed location in Kamakura.

The band has since revealed a continuation of this album is in the works, covering the stations of the Railway line which did not originally have a song. This began with Yanagikōji Parallel Universe, a B-side track to Demachiyanagi Parallel Universe.

Track listing 
All songs written and composed by Masafumi Gotō.

B-sides

Personnel

Masafumi Gotō – lead vocals, guitar, lyrics
Kensuke Kita – lead guitar, background vocals
Takahiro Yamada –  bass, background vocals
Kiyoshi Ijichi – drums
Asian Kung-Fu Generation – producer

Kenichi Nakamura – mixing, recording
Michifumi Onodera – mixing, recording
Stephen Marcussen – mastering
Stewart Whitmore – editing
Yusuke Nakamura – art direction

Chart positions

Album

Single

References
 CDJapan

Asian Kung-Fu Generation albums
2008 albums
Japanese-language albums
Sony Music albums